Gyanendra Khadka (died 2003) was a journalist of Nepal who was killed by Maoist insurgents during the Maoist insurgency in Nepal. He was brutally murdered by a group of Maoist rebels on 7 September 2003, in Jyamire village of Sindhupalchok District, Nepal.
At age of 35, Khadka was working as a reporter with the state-owned news agency Rastriya Samachar Samiti (RSS),.
Khadka was abducted from a school in the village by four gunmen and they tied his hands with a rope. When his wife searched for and discovered him, he was tied to a volleyball pole in the middle of the village. The rebels then slit his throat with a Khukuri (a knife) in front of his wife.

See also
List of kidnappings

References

2000s missing person cases
2003 deaths
Assassinated Nepalese journalists
Civilians killed in the Nepalese Civil War
Formerly missing people
Kidnapped Nepalese people
Male murder victims
Missing person cases in Nepal
Nepalese murder victims
Year of birth missing